Anhalt-Plötzkau was a principality located in Germany. It has been created on two occasions. It was created for a first time in 1544 following the partition of Anhalt-Dessau but the principality ceased to exist following the death of Prince George III in 1553 at which point it was inherited by the prince of Anhalt-Zerbst.

It was created for a second time in 1603 with the partition of the unified principality of Anhalt; this time, in order to create a bigger principality, parts of Anhalt-Bernburg were extracted. This second incarnation lasting until 1665 at which point Prince Lebrecht succeeded as Prince of Anhalt-Köthen and Plötzkau returned to the principality of Anhalt-Bernburg.

Princes of Anhalt-Plötzkau 1544-1553
George III 1544–1553
To Anhalt-Zerbst 1553.

Princes of Anhalt-Plötzkau 1603-1665
Augustus 1603–1653
Ernest Gottlieb 1653–1654
Lebrecht 1653–1665 (co-regent)
Emmanuel 1653–1665 (co-regent)

United with Anhalt-Bernburg 1665.

References
Regnal chronology

1544 establishments in the Holy Roman Empire
1665 disestablishments in the Holy Roman Empire
States and territories established in 1544
House of Ascania
Anhalt-Plotzkau
Plotzkau
Principalities of the Holy Roman Empire
Former states and territories of Saxony-Anhalt